Yvan Dautin (born 6 May 1945) is a French actor, writer, and singer. His best known songs are "Boulevard des Batignolles", written with Étienne Roda-Gil, and "La Méduse".

Biography
He was born Yvan Autain in Saint-Jean-de-Monts in Vendée.

He was married to Dominique Laffin. Their daughter is the French politician Clémentine Autain.

Songs

45 rpm  
 1968 : Premier disque chez Pathé Marconi sous la direction de l'orchestrateur Hubert Rostaing (Yves Montand, Serge Reggiani, Maxime Le Forestier, Philippe Sarde...), avec quatre chansons de Paul Villaz. Puis, Les fiancées, Les cheveux en quatre, La défense du gendarme, L'oiseau qui fait tchack tchack (super 45t.)
 1969 : La Comptine du cétacé, Le Piano homosexuel, Le Hibou, Ma clé de sol (super 45t.)
 1971 : La Méduse, Ca caille, ça tourterelle (enregistrement public)
 1972 : L'école est fermée, La mer est bleue à Plougastel 
 1976 : La Malmariée, Kate
 1977 : Lé fame é les enfan dabor
 1978 : La Portugaise (musique Julien Clerc et Quand j'étais dromadaire)
 1979 : Pataquès Les mains dans les poches sous les yeux
 1979 : Est-ce que c'est sale ça ?, Va nu-pied sur un pied 
 1981 : Le jour se lève du pied gauche, Boulevard des Batignolles coécrit avec Étienne Roda-Gil
 1983 : L'Amour chagrin, Changez, changez
 1985 : L'Île au trésor, Bristol
 1987 : La plume au cœur, Léa

33 rpm  
 1971 : Yvan Dautin, (enregistrement public à la Galerie 55 les 7 et 8 juillet 1971) EMI, 2 C 072-11782
 1975 : Hourra ! Dément ! Génial !, 33 t STEC 193
 1976 : Les femmes et les enfants d'abord, 33 t DiscAz STEC 235
 1977 : Kate, la méduse, l'école est fermée etc.., en public les 4-5 mai 1977, 33 t RCA PL37091
 1977 : Quand j’étais dromadaire, 33 t RCA/Victor PL 37 135
 1979 : Pataquès, 33 t RCA PL 37 258
 1981 : Le jour se lève du pied gauche, 33 t disc’AZ AZ/2 365
 1982 : Boulevard des Batignolles, 33 t disc’AZ AZ/2 440
 1988 : Entre chien et loup, 33 t L’escargot/mélodie ESC 30 46

CD 
 Compilations :
 1992 : Le cœur cerise Olivi music - OVI 45202-2
 1992 : Ses plus grands succès Olivi - music OVI 45203-
 Albums :
2008 : Ne pense plus, dépense ! Edito Musique
 2012 : Un monde à part - Amja Productions - Distribution : Socadisc
2019 : Le cœur à l'encan (EPM)

Participations 
 1990 : Ami entends tu… la Résistance (Martine Sarri, Yvan Dautin, Jean-Pierre Lacot et Jean Sommer)/ P.A.S.A

Acting

Television 
1976 : "Cinéma 16" Voici la fin mon bel ami (Jean-Paul), réalisation Bernard Bouthier, avec Jean-Luc Bideau, Françoise Pagès, Grégoire Aslan...
1987 : Les Idiots (un clochard), réalisation Jean-Daniel Verhaeghe, avec Jean Carmet, Jean-Pierre Marielle...
1989 : Les Nuits révolutionnaires (le camelot), réalisation Charles Brabant, avec Michel Aumont, Jean-Pierre Lorit, Michel Bouquet...
1989 : Bouvard et Pécuchet (Verjus) d'après Flaubert, mise en scène Jean-Daniel Verhaeghe.
1997 : Le Serre aux truffes (Dominique), réalisation Jacques Audoir, avec Pierre Vaneck, Jean-Michel Fête...
2005 : Maigret et l'Etoile du nord (Marc-Antoine Lehaleux), réalisation Charles Némes, avec Bruno Crémer, Luis Rego...
2005 : La Légende vraie de la Tour Eiffel (le directeur du cabaret), documentaire fiction réalisé par Simon Brook.
2009 : "Avocats & associés" Abus dangereux (patron du bar), réalisation Claire de la Rochefoucauld, avec François-Eric Gendron, Frédéric Gorny...

Film 
 2007: Enfin veuve (gendarme) - produced by Isabelle Mergault, with Michèle Laroque, Jacques Gamblin
 2013: Hôtel Normandy (receptionist) - produced by Charles Némes, with Helena Noguerra, Eric Elmosnino, Ary Abittan, Frédérique Bel

Theater 
1980 : Les Misérables (Monsieur Thénardier) by Claude-Michel Schönberg and Alain Boublil (musical), directed by Robert Hossein
1994 : Comment va le monde, môssieu ? il tourne, môssieu ! by François Billetdoux, directed by Jean-Pierre Miquel, Théâtre national de la Colline
1995 : Arsenic and old lace by Joseph Kesselring, directed by Jacques Rosny, Théâtre de la Madeleine

References

External links

1945 births
Living people
French actors
French writers
French male singers
People from Vendée